Lanier is a surname, after which various places, schools, etc, are named.

People
 Lanier (surname), list of people with the name

Places in the United States
 Lanier, Florida
 Lanier, Georgia
 Lanier County, Georgia
 Lake Lanier, an artificial lake on the Chattahoochee River, Georgia
 Lanier Mansion, Madison, Indiana, home of James F. D. Lanier

Schools in the United States

 Lanier Middle School (Houston), Houston, Texas
 Lanier Middle School (Buford, Georgia), Buford, Georgia
 Lanier Middle School (Fairfax, Virginia), Fairfax, Virginia
 Sidney Lanier High School, Montgomery, Alabama
 Lanier High School (Austin, Texas), Austin, Texas
 Lanier High School (Jackson, Mississippi), Jackson, Mississippi
 Lanier High School, Macon, Georgia (now part of Central High School)
 Lanier University, a short-lived Baptist then KKK-run university in Atlanta, Georgia
 Lanier Technical College, Gainesville, Georgia

Other uses
 Lanier, a brand of printers (subsidiary of Ricoh)
 USS Lanier (APA-125), a US Navy attack transport ship, of World War II vintage

See also